Boole is a lunar impact crater that lies along the northwestern limb of the Moon, to the northwest of the crater Gerard. At this location it is viewed nearly from the side, and is very oblong in shape due to foreshortening. The crater formation is nearly circular, however, with a wide inner wall that has been worn and rounded due to subsequent impacts. It is named after George Boole.

To the north of Boole is the crater Cremona, and to the southwest are Paneth and Smoluchowski. The eroded and somewhat distorted satellite crater Boole E is attached to the southern rim, forming a saddle-shaped valley between the two formations. The interior floor of Boole is relatively flat, and marked only by tiny craterlets. There is a small craterlet on the floor next to the southwest rim, and a tiny crater along the western inner wall.

The surface along the western face of Boole is pock-marked by a multitude of small craterlets that run in a northerly direction towards Brianchon. A sequence of these impacts forms a short catena, or crater chain, near the western rim of Boole.

Satellite craters
By convention these features are identified on lunar maps by placing the letter on the side of the crater midpoint that is closest to Boole.

References

 
 
 
 
 
 
 
 
 
 
 
 

Impact craters on the Moon